American Girl is a line of dolls, books, and accessories.

American Girl(s) may also refer to:

Film
 American Girl (film series)
 American Girl (2002 film), an American comedy-drama
 American Girl (2021 film), a Taiwanese drama
 American Girls (film), a 1918 Dutch silent film
 Kit Kittredge: An American Girl, a 2008 American film

Literature
 American Girl (magazine), a magazine published by the American Girl company
 American Girl, a magazine published by the Girl Scouts of the US from 1920 to 1979
 American Girl (book series)
 The American Girl, a 2005 novel by Monika Fagerholm

Music 
 American Girls (band), a 1980s all-female music group
 "American Girl" (Tom Petty song), 1976
 "American Girl" (Bonnie McKee song), 2013
 "American Girls" (song), a 2002 song by Counting Crows
 "American Girls", a song by FM from Indiscreet
 "American Girls", a song by Homie from the soundtrack of the film Meet the Deedles
 American Girl (album), a 1999 album by Juice Newton
 American Gurl, a 2022 album by Kilo Kish

Other uses
American Girls Podcast
 The American Girls (TV series), a 1978–79 US network television program
 American Girl (video game series)

See also 
 "My Own American Girl", a 2003 episode of the TV series Scrubs
 All American Girl (disambiguation)
 American painted lady, a butterfly
 American Woman (disambiguation)